The 1990 Supertaça Cândido de Oliveira was the 12th edition of the Supertaça Cândido de Oliveira, the annual Portuguese football season-opening match contested by the winners of the previous season's top league and cup competitions (or cup runner-up in case the league- and cup-winning club is the same). The 1990 Supertaça Cândido de Oliveira was contested over two legs, and opposed Estrela da Amadora and Porto of the Primeira Liga. Porto qualified for the SuperCup by winning the 1989–90 Primeira Divisão, whilst Estrela da Amadora qualified for the Supertaça by winning the 1989–90 Taça de Portugal.

The first leg which took place at the Estádio José Gomes, saw Estrela da Amadora defeat Porto 2–1. The second leg which took place at the Estádio das Antas saw Porto defeat Estrela da Amadora 3–0 (4–2 on aggregate), which claimed the Portistas a fifth Supertaça.

First leg

Details

Second leg

Details

References

Supertaça Cândido de Oliveira
1990–91 in Portuguese football
FC Porto matches
C.F. Estrela da Amadora matches